Canal Dime Savings Bank, also known as Eckerd's Drug Store, is a historic bank building located at Columbia, South Carolina. It was built between 1892 and 1895, and is a three-story, Romanesque Revival style brick building with a granite façade and red barrel tile roof.  The building was purchased by Eckerd's Drug Store in 1936.

It was added to the National Register of Historic Places in 1980.

References

Bank buildings on the National Register of Historic Places in South Carolina
Romanesque Revival architecture in South Carolina
Commercial buildings completed in 1895
Buildings and structures in Columbia, South Carolina
National Register of Historic Places in Columbia, South Carolina